Mirima National Park also commonly known as Hidden Valley National Park is a National Park in far northern Western Australia located at the eastern side of the Kimberley region.

Unusual sandstone formations dominate the park and are often compared to the Bungle Bungles.

The area is of great significance to the local indigenous peoples, the Miriuwung, and several examples of rock art can be found within the park.

"Mirima" is the name given by the Miriwoong people to the area extending some 150 kilometres to the north and south, and 170 kilometres to the east and west from Kununurra.

Access to the park is via a sealed bitumen road and an entry fee to the park applies. Camping and fires within the park are not permitted. Facilities include toilets, tables, information shelters and three walk trails around the park.

See also
 Protected areas of Western Australia

References

National parks of Western Australia
Kimberley (Western Australia)
Protected areas established in 1982
1982 establishments in Australia
Kimberley tropical savanna